On September 27, 1312, the Duke of Brabant signed the Charter of Kortenberg that should better be referred to as a constitution. It was valid for the entire duchy of Brabant. From this charter originated a kind of "Parliament of Kortenberg" or a "Council of Kortenberg" or what was called an assembly of "The Lords of Kortenberg".   

The control organ, a precursor of the later "Estate assembly" (namely, the first estate was the clergy, the second estate was the nobility, and the third estate was the municipalities) gathered in the Kortenberg Abbey and elsewhere with ups and downs until 1375.

From 1332 on the council was extended by two more members, so that there were 16 Lords; Antwerp got a second member and the Walloon Brabant town of Nivelles also got a member. In 1340 documents were sealed with a special seal on which a tree was planted on a little hill (the "short" or "sharp"?).  The seal bore the words "SIGILUM COMMUNE : CONSILII DE CORTENBERGHE" (the common or usual seal of the Council of Kortenberg).

Magna Carta and the Charter of Kortenberg

Although Magna Carta is commonly regarded as the very first charter giving rise to medieval European constitutionalism, the Charter of Kortenberg appears to have been far more democratic in nature.  This mainly because the beneficiaries of Magna Carta were only the barons while the beneficiaries of the Charter of Kortenberg included all citizens, expressly 'the rich and the poor' (riken ende armen).

Reinforcing this view is the composition of the Council of Kortenberg which clearly marks a difference with the more 'elitist' Magna Carta. Whilst Magna Carta was to be implemented by a council of 25 barons, the Council of Kortenberg counted four knights and ten townsmen. In the financial commission of August 1314 the nobility were only two against the representatives of eight towns.

Because of the historical continuity from the Charter of Kortenberg to the Joyous Entries of many monarchs or their governors into Flemish and Brabantian towns, the migration of many educated citizens in the 16th & 17th century from these towns to the Seven United Provinces as a result of the Eighty Years' War and the stay of the Pilgrim Fathers into those Provinces (in the Dutch city of Leiden) prior to their departure for America, coupled with the enduring influence of New Netherlander society upon the early American political life, the emphasis placed by American historians and the general public opinion upon the constitutive nature of Magna Carta for the American constitution and the American Dream seems too narrow if no mention is made from the Charter of Kortenberg or other Brabantian charters.

Modern version of the charter of Kortenberg
We, duke John II of Brabant, agree

 That no other demands or taxes be levied than those which are known as the three feudal cases: 
 at the knighthood of my son
 the wedding of my daughter
 and if I should be taken captive 
The taxes will be reasonable (fiscal prerogative). 
 An honourable jurisdiction for rich and poor. (judicial prerogative). 
 To recognise the freedom of our good towns. (municipal prerogative). 
 To establish a council which shall be comprised (sic) of:
 4 knights or nobles.
 10 representatives from the 5 cities as follows: 
 3 from Leuven
 3 from Brussels
 1 from Antwerp
 1 from 's-Hertogenbosch (nowadays in North Brabant, Netherlands)
 1 from Tienen
 1 from Zoutleeuw
 This council be allowed to meet at Kortenberg in the Abbey. It will meet every 3 weeks to monitor whether the financial, judicial and municipal prerogatives are observed.
 That in the future improvements are introduced to the administration of the land by the council.
 That upon the death of members of the Council of Kortenberg, new members be designated.
 That the members of the Council take an oath on the Holy Gospel that they will pursue the best interests of the public.
 That the people have the right to resist should the Duke or his descendants refuse to observe the Charter of Kortenberg.

References

14th century in the duchy of Brabant
1312 in Europe
Kortenberg
1310s in the Holy Roman Empire
History of Flemish Brabant